The England cricket team toured South Africa from October 1964 to February 1965, during which time they played five Test matches against the South Africa national cricket team. England won the first Test, but the remaining four matches finished as draws, giving England a 1–0 series victory.

Test series

1st Test

2nd Test

3rd Test

4th Test

5th Test

External links
Series home at ESPNcricinfo

1964 in English cricket
1964 in South African cricket
1965 in English cricket
1965 in South African cricket
1964-65
International cricket competitions from 1960–61 to 1970
England 1964-65